This is a list of faults in Pakistan.

Geology

Chaman Fault

The Chaman Fault is a major, active geological fault in Pakistan and Afghanistan that runs for over 850 km.   Tectonically, it is actually a system of related geologic faults that separates the Eurasian Plate from the Indo-Australian Plate. It is a terrestrial, primarily transform, left-lateral strike-slip fault.  The slippage rate along the Chaman fault system as the Indo-Australian Plate moves northward (relative to the Eurasian Plate) has been estimated at 10 mm/yr or more. In addition to its primary transform aspect, the Chaman fault system has a compressional component as the Indian Plate is colliding with the Eurasian Plate.  This type of plate boundary is sometimes called a transpressional boundary.

Shyok Suture Zone
The Shyok Suture Zone is a cretaceous-tertiary suture located in Gilgit-Baltistan which separates the Karakoram from the cretaceous Kohistan–Ladakh oceanic arc. In previously published interpretations, the Shyok Suture Zone marks either the site of subduction of a wide Tethys Ocean, or represents an early cretaceous intra-continental marginal basin along the southern margin of Asia. A sedimentological, structural and igneous geochemical study was made of a well-exposed traverse in Skardu. To the south of the Shyok Suture Zone in this area is the Ladakh Arc and its Late Cretaceous, mainly volcanogenic, sedimentary cover (Burje-La Formation). The Shyok Suture Zone extends northwards (ca. 30 km) to the late tertiary Main Karakoram Thrust that transported Asian, mainly high-grade metamorphic rocks southwards over the suture zone.

Other faults
Main Karakoram Thrust
Riasi Thrust
Salt Range Thrust
Bannu Fault
Quetta-Chiltan Fault
Allah Bund Fault
Hoshab Fault
Makran Coastal Fault
Main Mantle Thrust
Main Frontal Thrust
Jhelum Fault
Kalabagh Fault
Kurram Fault
Ornach-Nal Transform Fault
Kirthar Fault
Kutch Mainland Fault
Nagar Parkar Fault
Nai Rud Fault
Rawat Fault
Raikot Fault
Jhelum Fault (PJ)
Punjal-Khairabad Thrust (PJ)
Kurram Fault (KP)
Kirthar Fault (SN)
Pab Fault (SN)

See also
 List of earthquakes in Pakistan
 Geology of Pakistan

References

Further reading

Geology of Pakistan